Tiruchirapalli Srinivasan Rangarajan, professionally credited by his pseudonym Vaali (born 29 October 1931 – 18 July 2013) was an Indian poet who has the record for writing the most number of songs in Tamil cinema. He is also recognised for a five-decade long association in the Tamil film industry and has written over 15,000 songs. He acted in a number of films, including Sathya, Hey Ram, Paarthale Paravasam and Poikkal Kudhirai. He was honoured by the Government of India with the Padma Shri, India's fourth highest civilian honour in 2007.

Biography
Vaali was born in a Iyengar brahmin family as T. S. Rangarajan on 29 October 1931 to Srinivasan Iyengar and Ponnammal Iyengar. His native place is Thirupparaithurai, Tiruchirappalli district. Growing up, he studied at Higher Secondary School for Boys, Srirangam, Srirangam till he finished his SSLC. He went to Madras in the 1950 seeking an opportunity in Tamil film industry. In the 1960s and 1970s, he received patronage from actor M. G. Ramachandran and became a successful lyricist, in competition with poet Kannadasan, which he had chronicled in his autobiography Naanum Indha Nootrandum. Vaali has also authored other books such as Avathara Purushan, Pandavar Bhoomi, Ramanuja Kaviyam, Krishna Vijayam, Thamizh Kadavul, Kalaignar Kaviyam, Krishna Bhakthan and Vaaliba vaali. His song "Amma Endru Azhaikatha Uyir Illaiye" is carved in the stone in a temple in Trichy. He wrote songs for M. G. Ramachandran in 63 films and also for Sivaji Ganesan in 70 films. He has written more than 15000 songs in Tamil films.

He died on 18 July 2013 in Chennai following respiratory illness, at the age of 82.

Awards
Civilian honours
 Padmashri in 2007

Tamil Nadu State Film Awards
Vaali is a five-time winner of the Tamil Nadu State Film Award for Best Lyricist
 1970 – Engal Thangamm
 1979 – Ivargal Vidhyasamanavargal
 1989 – Varusham Padhinaaru and Apoorva Sagodharargal
 1990 – Keladi Kanmani
 2008 – Dasavathaaram

Books
 Amma-1976
 Avathara Purushan-1995
 Naanum Indha Nootrandum
 Pandavar Bhoomi
 Ramanuja Kaviyam
 Krishna Vijayam
 Thamizh Kadavul
 Kalaignar Kaviyam
 Krishna Bhakthan
 Vaaliba vaali
 Poikkal kuthiraikal    
 Nija Govintham
 Azagiya Singers
 Pennin Perundhakka Yavula
 Bhagavad Geethai
 Ninaivu Nadakkal

Filmography

As lyricist

2010s

 2014 – Naan Than Bala (Tamil) 
 2014 – Ninaivil Nindraval (Tamil)
 2014 – Kaaviya Thalaivan (Tamil)
 2014 – Thirudan Police (Tamil)
 2014 – Yaan (Tamil)
 2014 – Ramanujan (Tamil)
 2014 – Kochadaiyaan (Tamil)
 2014 – Pannaiyarum Padminiyum (Tamil)
 2013 – Endrendrum Punnagai (Tamil)
 2013 – Biriyani (Tamil)
 2013 – Maryan (Tamil)
 2013 – Thillu Mullu (Tamil)
 2013 – Ethir Neechal (Tamil)
 2013 – Udhayam NH4 (Tamil)
 2013 – Alex Pandian (Tamil)
 2013 – Kanna Laddu Thinna Aasaiya (Tamil)
 2012 – Podaa Podi (Tamil)
 2012 – Mirattal (Tamil)
 2012 – Thadaiyara Thakka (Tamil)
 2012 – Aadhalal Kadhal Seiveer (Tamil)
 2011 – Osthe (Tamil)
 2011 – Vedi (Tamil)
 2011 – Mankatha (Tamil)
 2011 – Sattapadi Kutram (Tamil)
 2011 – Aadu Puli (Tamil)
 2011 – Uyarthiru 420 (Tamil)
 2011 – Maveeran (Tamil)
 2011 – Kanden (Tamil)
 2011 – Engeyum Kaadhal (Tamil)
 2011 – Ponnar Shankar (Tamil)
 2010 – Baana Kaathadi (Tamil)
 2010 – Sura (Tamil)
 2010 – Agarathi (Tamil)
 2010 – Theeratha Vilayattu Pillai (Tamil)
 2010 – Leelai (Tamil)
 2010 – Valiban Sutrum Ulagam (Tamil)
 2010 – Thottuppaar (Tamil)
 2010 – Goa (Tamil)
 2010 – Guru Sishyan (Tamil)
 2010 – Viruthagiri (Tamil)
 2010 – Kadhalukku Maranamillai (Tamil)
 2010 – Nanda Nanditha (Tamil) 
 2010 – Maanja Velu (Tamil)
 2010 – Pen Singam (Tamil)
 2010 – Chikku Bukku (Tamil)

2000s

 2009 – Jagan Mohini (Tamil) 
 2009 – Vaalmiki (Tamil)
 2009 – Aadhavan (Tamil)
 2009 – Kunguma Poovum Konjum Puravum (Tamil)
 2009 – Naan Kadavul (Tamil)
 2009 – Mathiya Chennai (Tamil)
 2009 – Naadodigal (Tamil)
 2009 – Malai Malai (Tamil)
 2009 – Arundhathi (Tamil)
 2009 – Panchamirtham (Tamil)
 2008 – Silambattam (Tamil)
 2008 – Singakutty (Tamil)
 2008 – Bommalattam (Tamil, dubbed)
 2008 – Kuselan (Tamil)
 2008 – Dhanam (Tamil)
 2008 – Sakkarakatti (Tamil)
 2008 – Saroja (Tamil)
 2008 – Dasavathaaram (Tamil)
 2008 – Jayam Kondaan (Tamil)
 2008 – Saroja (Tamil)
 2007 – Azhagiya Thamizh Magan (Tamil)
 2007 – Unnale Unnale (Tamil)
 2007 – Thottal Poo Malarum (Tamil)
 2007 – Billa (Tamil)
 2007 – En Uyirinum Melana (Tamil)
 2007 – Aalwar (Tamil)
 2007 – Chennai 600028 (Tamil)
 2007 – Kaalai (Tamil)
 2007 – Sivaji (Tamil)
 2007 – Inimey Nangathan (Tamil)
 2006 – Sillunu Oru Kaadhal (Tamil)
 2006 – Vallavan (Tamil)
 2006 – Kalvanin Kadhali (Tamil)
 2005 – Chidambarathil Oru Appasamy (Tamil)
 2005 – Anbe Aaruyire (Tamil)
 2005 – Oru Naal Oru Kanavu (Tamil)
 2005 – Mumbai Xpress (Tamil)
 2005 – Chandramukhi (Tamil)
 2005 – Ghajini (Tamil)
 2005 – Mannin Maindhan (Tamil)
 2005 – Desam (Tamil) – (D)
 2004 – New (Tamil)
 2004 – Kuththu (Tamil)
 2004 – M. Kumaran Son of Mahalakshmi (Tamil)
 2004 – Manmadhan (Tamil)
 2003 – Boys (Tamil)
 2003 – Lesa Lesa (Tamil)
 2003 – Dum (Tamil)
 2003 – Pudhiya Geethai (Tamil)
 2002 – Baba (Tamil)
 2002 – Mounam Pesiyadhe (Tamil)
 2002 – Kadhal Virus (Tamil)
 2002 – Shree (Tamil)
 2002 – Punnagai Desam (Tamil)
 2002 – Thenkasi Pattanam (Tamil)
 2002 – Bhagavathi (Tamil)
 2002 – Youth(Tamil)
 2001 – Narasimma (Tamil)
 2001 – Dhosth (Malayalam)
 2001 – Chocolate (Tamil)
 2001 – Looty (Tamil)
 2001 – Dheena (Tamil)
 2001 – Parthale Paravasam (Tamil)
 2001 – Minnale (Tamil)
 2001 – Middle Class Madhavan (Tamil)
 2000 – Pennin Manathai Thottu (Tamil)
 2000 – Simmasanam (Tamil)
 2000 – Priyamaanavale (Tamil)
 2000 – Hey Ram (Tamil)
 2000 – Vanna Thamizh Pattu (Tamil)

1990s

 1999 – Manam Virumbuthe Unnai (Tamil)
 1999 – Mannavaru Sinnavaru (Tamil)
 1999 – Kadhalar Dhinam (Tamil)
 1998 – Marumalarchi (Tamil)
 1998 – Kadhala Kadhala (Tamil)
 1998 – Ninaithen Vandhai (Tamil)
 1997 – Bharathi Kannamma (Tamil)
 1997 – Vaimaye Vellum (Tamil)
 1997 – Thambi Durai (Tamil)
 1996 – Mr. Romeo (Tamil)
 1996 – Tata Birla (Tamil)
 1996 – Kalloori Vaasal (Tamil)
 1996 – Poovarasan (Tamil)
 1996 – Maanbumigu Maanavan (Tamil)
 1996 – Poove Unakkaga (Tamil)
 1996 – Kadhal Desam (Tamil)
 1996 – Nethaji (Tamil)
 1996 – Vaanmathi (Tamil)
 1996 – Indian (Tamil)
 1996 – Coimbatore Mappillai (Tamil)
 1996 – Selva (Tamil)
 1995 – Thirumoorthy(Tamil)
 1995 – Rajavin Parvaiyile (Tamil)
 1995 – Mr. Madras (Tamil)
 1995 – Aasai (Tamil)
 1995 – Oru Oorla Oru Rajakumari (Tamil)
 1995 – Aanazhagan (Tamil)
 1995 – Muthu Kaalai (Tamil)
 1995 – Periya Kudumbam (Tamil)
 1995 – Deva (film) (Tamil)
 1995 – Thotta Chinungi (Tamil)
 1995 – Chinna Vathiyar (Tamil)
 1995 – Kattumarakaran (Tamil)
 1995 – Raasaiyya (Tamil)
 1995 – Sathi Leelavathi (Tamil)
 1995 – Kolangal (Tamil)
 1995 – Chandralekha (Tamil)
 1995 – Ragasiya Police (Tamil)
 1994 – Veera(Tamil)
 1994 – Mahanadi (Tamil)
 1994 – Kanmani (Tamil)
 1994 – Raasa Magan (Tamil)
 1994 – Senthamizh Selvan (Tamil)
 1994 – Kadhalan (Tamil)
 1994 – Mogamul (Tamil)
 1994 – Rasigan (Tamil)
 1994 – Watchman Vadivel (Tamil)
 1994 – Veetla Visheshanga (Tamil)
 1994 – Adharmam (Tamil)
 1994 – En Aasai Machan (Tamil) 
 1994 – Indhu (Tamil)
 1994 – Seeman (Tamil)
 1994 – Priyanka (Tamil)
 1993 – Manichitrathazhu (Malayalam)
 1993 – Ulle Veliye (Tamil)
 1993 – Walter Vetrivel (Tamil)
 1993 – Valli (Tamil)
 1993 – Chinna Jameen (Tamil)
 1993 – Karpagam Vanthachu (Tamil)
 1993 – Kathirukka Neramillai (Tamil)
 1993 – Kalaignan (Tamil)
 1993 – Maharasan (Tamil)
 1993 – Chinna Mapillai (Tamil)
 1993 – Sendhoorapandi (Tamil)
 1993 – Yejaman (Tamil)
 1993 – Uzhaippali (Tamil)
 1993 – Uzhavan (Tamil)
 1993 – Chinna Kannamma (Tamil)
 1993 – Dharmaseelan (Tamil)
 1993 – I Love India (Tamil)
 1993 – Marupadiyum (Tamil)
 1992 –   ( ( Thilagam ) ) ( tamil )
 1992 – Thevar Magan (Tamil)
 1992 – Naangal (Tamil)
 1992 – Suriyan (Tamil)
 1992 – Singaravelan (Tamil)
 1992 – Oorpanchayathu (Tamil)
 1992 – Vanna Vanna Pookkal (Tamil)
 1992 – Nadodi Pattukkaran (Tamil)
 1992 – Chinna Marumagal (Tamil)
 1992 – Deiva Vaakku (Tamil)
 1992 – Senthamizh Paattu (Tamil)
 1992 – Unna Nenachen Pattu Padichen (Tamil)
 1992 – Mannan (Tamil)
 1992 – Meera (Tamil)
 1992 – Chembaruthi (Tamil)
 1991 – Guna (Tamil)
 1991 – Thalapathi (Tamil)
 1991 – Maanagara Kaaval (Tamil)
 1991 – Kizhakku Karai (Tamil)
 1991 – Thalattu Ketkuthamma (Tamil)
 1991 – Nee Pathi Naan Pathi (Tamil)
 1991 – Gopura Vasalile (Tamil)
 1991 – Chinna Thambi (Tamil)
 1991 – Ayul Kaithi (Tamil)
 1991 – Idhayam (Tamil)
 1991 – Eeramana Rojave (Tamil)
 1991 – Bramma (Tamil)
 1991 – Rudhra (Tamil)
 1991 – Thaipoosam (Tamil)
 1991 – Gnana Paravai (Tamil)
 1990 – Keladi Kanmani (Tamil)
 1990 – Kizhakku Vasal (Tamil)
 1990 – Sandhana Kaatru (Tamil)
 1990 – Raja Kaiya Vacha (Tamil)
 1990 – Anjali (Tamil)
 1990 – Ethir Kaatru (Tamil)
 1990 – My Dear Marthandan (Tamil)
 1990 – Sirayil Pootha Sinna Malar (Tamil)
 1990 – Unnai Solli Kutramillai (Tamil)
 1990 – Velai Kidaichuduchu (Tamil)
 1990 – Nadigan (Tamil)
 1990 – Puthu Paatu (Tamil)
 1990 – Vaazhkai Chakkaram (Tamil)
 1990 – Puriyaadha Pudhir (Tamil)
 1990 – Panakkaran (Tamil)

1980s

 1989 – Ponmana Selvan (Tamil)
 1989 – Vetri Vizha (Tamil)
 1989 – Siva (Tamil)
 1989 – Apoorva Sagodharargal (Tamil)
 1989 – Varusham 16 (Tamil)
 1989 – Dharmam Vellum (Tamil)
 1989 – Thangamaana Purushan (Tamil)
 1989 – Ennai Peththa Rasaa (Tamil)
 1989 – Rajanadai (Tamil)
 1989 – Aararo Aariraro (Tamil)
 1989 – Pudhu Pudhu Arthangal (Tamil)
 1988 – Sahadevan Mahadevan (Tamil)
 1988 – Manamagale Vaa (Tamil)
 1988 – Thambi Thanga Kambi (Tamil)
 1988 – En Thamizh En Makkal (Tamil)
 1988 – Dharmathin Thalaivan (Tamil)
 1988 – Solla Thudikkuthu Manasu (Tamil)
 1988 – Kaliyugam (Tamil)
 1988 – Sathya (Tamil)
 1988 – Idhu Namma Aalu (Tamil)
 1988 – Poruthadhu Podhum (Tamil)
 1988 – Guru Sishyan (1988 film) (Tamil)
 1987 – Veerapandiyan (Tamil)
 1987 – Anjadha Singam (Tamil)
 1987 – Sirai Paravai (Tamil)
 1987 – Kavalan Avan Kovalan (Tamil)
 1987 – Oorkavalan (Tamil)
 1987 – Kudumbam Oru Koyil (Tamil)
 1987 – Poomazhai Pozhiyudhu (Tamil)
 1987 – Paadu Nilave (Tamil)
 1987 – Enga Chinna Rasa (Tamil)
 1987 – Mupperum Deviyar (Tamil)
 1987 – Manathil Uruthi Vendum (Tamil)
 1986 – Mella Thirandhathu Kadhavu (Tamil)
 1986 – Marumagal (Tamil)
 1986 – Samsaram Adhu Minsaram (Tamil)
 1986 – Uyire Unakkaga (Tamil)
 1986 – Lakshmi Vandhachu (Tamil)
 1986 – Dharmapathini (Tamil)
 1986 – Dharma Devathai (Tamil)
 1986 – Vasantha Raagam (Tamil)
 1986 – Nambinar Keduvadhillai (Tamil)
 1986 – Anandha Kanneer (Tamil)
 1986 – Mouna Ragam (Tamil)
 1986 – Saadhanai (Tamil)
 1986 – Oru Iniya Udhayam (Tamil)
 1986 – Annai En Dheivam (Tamil)
 1986 – Viduthalai (Tamil)
 1986 – Enakku Naaney Needhibathi (Tamil)
 1986 – Naan Adimai Illai (Tamil)
 1985 – Naam Iruvar (Tamil)
 1985 – Udaya Geetham (Tamil)
 1985 – Deivapiravi
 1985 – Uyarndha Ullam (Tamil)
 1985 – Nalla Thambi (Tamil)
 1985 – Padikkadha Pannaiyar (Tamil)
 1985 – Bandham (Tamil)
 1985 – Naan Sigappu Manithan (Tamil)
 1985 – Kettimelam (Tamil)
 1985 – Raja Rishi (Tamil)
 1985 – Needhiyin Nizhal (Tamil)
 1985 – Kanni Rasi (Tamil)
 1985 – Padikkadavan (Tamil)
 1985 – Mangamma Sabadham (Tamil)
 1985 – Manakanakku (Tamil)
 1984 – Kudumbam (Tamil)
 1984 – Idhu Enga Boomi (Tamil)
 1984 – Naalai Unathu Naal (Tamil)
 1984 – Nalla Naal (Tamil)
 1984 – Nallavanuku Nallavan (Tamil)
 1984 – Kuzhandhai Yesu (Tamil)
 1984 – Anbulla Rajinikanth (Tamil)
 1984 – Madras Vathiyar (Tamil)
 1984 – Simma Soppanam (Tamil)
 1984 – Vidhi (Tamil)
 1984 – Iru Medhaigal (Tamil)
 1984 – Osai (Tamil)
 1984 – Vaidehi Kathirunthal (Tamil)
 1984 – Sathiyam Neeye (Tamil)
 1984 – Veettukku Oru Kannagi (Tamil)
 1984 – Vellai Pura Ondru (Tamil)
 1984 – Kai Kodukkum Kai (Tamil)
 1984 – Theerppu En Kaiyil (Tamil)
 1984 – Dhavani Kanavugal (Tamil)
 1984 – Madurai Sooran (Tamil)
 1984 – Vamsa Vilakku (Tamil)
 1984 – Anbe Odi Vaa (Tamil)
 1983 – Miruthanga Chakravarthi (Tamil)
 1983 – Thoongadhey Thambi Thoongadhey (Tamil)
 1983 – Sumangali (Tamil)
 1983 – Thai Veedu (Tamil)
 1983 – Paayum Puli (Tamil)
 1983 – Kozhi Koovuthu (Tamil)
 1983 – Saranalayam (Tamil)
 1983 – Neethibathi (Tamil)
 1983 – Soorakottai Singakutti (Tamil)
 1983 – Sandhippu (Tamil)
 1983 – Thanga Magan (Tamil)
 1983 – Sivappu Sooriyan (Tamil)
 1983 – Adutha Varisu (Tamil)
 1983 – Vellai Roja (Tamil)
 1982 – Ranga (Tamil)
 1982 – Gopurangal Saivathillai (Tamil)
 1982 – Enkeyo Ketta Kural (Tamil)
 1982 – Nenjangal (Tamil)
 1982 – Paritchaikku Neramaachu (Tamil)
 1982 – Kanne Radha (Tamil)
 1982 – Thunai (Tamil)
 1982 – Sakalakala Vallavan (Tamil)
 1982 – Thaai Mookaambikai (Tamil)
 1982 – Vaa Kanna Vaa (Tamil)
 1982 – Pattanathu Rajakkal (Tamil)
 1982 – Vazhvey Maayam (Tamil)
 1982 – Thanikattu Raja (Tamil)
 1982 – Thooral Ninnu Pochu (Tamil)
 1982 – Moondru Mugam (Tamil)
 1981– Mouna Geethangal
 1981– Kudumbam Oru Kadambam
 1981– Aaniver
 1981– Agni Satchi
 1981– Manal Kayiru
 1980– Kannil Theriyum Kathaikal"
 1980– Nizhalgal 1980– Othaiyadi Pathaiyile 1980– Natchathiram 

1950s–1970s

 1979 – Allaudinaum Arputha Vilakkum (Tamil)
 1979 – Kadavul Amaitha Medai (Tamil)
 1979 – Dharma Yuddam (Tamil)
 1979 – Anbe Sangeetha (Tamil)
 1979 – Naan Vazhavaippen (Tamil)
 1979 – Annai Oru Alayam (Tamil)
 1978 – Ilamai Oonjal Aadukirathu (Tamil)
 1978 – Sadhurangam (Tamil)
 1978 – Justice Gopinath (Tamil)
 1978 – Achani (Tamil)
 1978 – Sigappu Rojakkal (Tamil)
 1978 – Pilot Premnath (Tamil)
 1978 – Vanakkatukuriya Kathaliye (Tamil)
 1978 – Mangudi Minor (Tamil)
 1977 – Indru Pol Endrum Vaazhga (Tamil)
 1977 – Navarathinam (Tamil)
 1977 – Meenava Nanban (Tamil)
 1977 – Aarupushpangal (Tamil)
 1976 – Bhadrakali (Tamil)
 1976 – Naalai Namadhe (Tamil)
 1976 – Needhikku Thalaivanangu (Tamil)
 1976 – Oorukku Uzhaippavan (Tamil)
 1975 – Ninaithadhai Mudippavan (Tamil)
 1975 – Idhayakkani (Tamil)
 1975 – Anbe Aaruyire (Tamil)
 1974 – Netru Indru Naalai (Tamil)
 1974 – Urimaikural (Tamil)
 1974 – Sirithu Vazha Vendum (Tamil)
 1974 – Dheerga Sumangali (Tamil)
 1973 – Bharatha Vilas (Tamil)
 1973 – Ulagam Sutrum Valiban (Tamil)
 1973 – Suryakanthi (Tamil) 
 1973 – Sollathaan Ninaikkiren (Tamil) 
 1972 – Annamitta Kai (Tamil)
 1972 – Naan Yen Pirandhen (Tamil)
 1972 – Idhaya Veenai (Tamil)
 1972 – Velli Vizha (Tamil)
 1972 – Raman Thediya Seethai (Tamil)
 1971 – Neerum Neruppum (Tamil)
 1971 – Rickshawkaran (Tamil)
 1971 – Oru Thaai Makkal (Tamil)
 1971 – Kumari Kottam (Tamil)
 1971 – Annai Velankanni (Tamil)
 1970 – Engal Thangam (Tamil)
 1970 – Maattukara Velan (Tamil)
 1970 – En Annan (Tamil)
 1970 – Ethiroli (Tamil)
 1970 – Maanavan (Tamil)
 1970 – Thedi Vandha Mappillai (Tamil)
 1970 – Thalaivan (Tamil)
 1969 – Iru Kodugal (Tamil)
 1969 – Adimaippenn (Tamil)
 1969 – Subadhinam (Tamil)
 1969 – Nil Gavani Kadhali (Tamil)
 1969 – Nam Naadu (Tamil)
 1968 – Kannan En Kadhalan  (Tamil)
 1968 – Kudiyirundha Koyil (Tamil)
 1968 – Chakkaram (Tamil)
 1968 – Galatta Kalyanam (Tamil)
 1968 – Ethir Neechal (Tamil)
 1968 – Kanavan (Tamil)
 1968 – Ther Thiruvizha (Tamil)
 1968 – Oli Vilakku (Tamil)
 1968 – Ragasiya Police 115 (Tamil)
 1968 – Uyarntha Manithan (Tamil)
 1967 – Iru Malargal (Tamil)
 1967 – Kaavalkaaran (Tamil)
 1967 – Arasa Kattalai (Tamil)
 1967 – Adhey Kangal (Tamil)
 1967 – Selva Magal (Tamil)
 1967 – Aval (Tamil)
 1967 – Pesum Deivam (Tamil)
 1966 – Petralthan Pillaiya (Tamil)
 1966 – Naan Aanaiyittal (Tamil)
 1966 – Thaali Bhagyam (Tamil)
 1966 – Major Chandrakanth (Tamil)
 1966 – Chandhrodhayam (Tamil)
 1966 – Anbe Vaa (Tamil)
 1966 – Nadodi (Tamil)
 1966 – Motor Sundaram Pillai (Tamil)
 1965 – Panam Padaithavan (Tamil)
 1965 – Thazhampoo (Tamil)
 1965 – Anbu Karangal (Tamil)
 1965 – Kalangarai Vilakkam (Tamil)
 1965 – Aayirathil Oruvan  (Tamil)
 1965 – Aasai Mugam (Tamil)
 1965 – Enga Veetu Pillai (Tamil)
 1965 – Vennira Aadai (Tamil)
 1964 – Padagotti (Tamil)
 1964 – Dheiva Thaai (Tamil)
 1964 – Thaayin Madiyil (Tamil)
 1963 – Karpagam (Tamil)
 1963 – Edhaiyum Thaangum Idhayam (Tamil)
 1963 – Idayathil Nee (Tamil)
 1961 – Nallavan Vazhvan (Tamil)
 1961 – Chandrakanth (Tamil)
 1958 – Azhagarmalai Kalvan (Tamil)

As actor
Films
 2002 – Kadhal Virus (Tamil)
 2001 – Paarthale Paravasam (Tamil)
 2000 – Hey Ram (Tamil)
 1988 – Sathya (Tamil)
 1983 – Poikkal Kudhirai (Tamil)
TelevisionKaialavu ManasuAs writer
 1974 – Kaliyuga Kannan 1976 - Oru Kodiyil Iru Malargal1976 - Adhirshtam Azhaikkirathu1976 - Muthana Muthallavo 1979 – Kadavul Amaitha Medai – Screenplay, Dialogues
 1983 – Magudi 1987 – Ore Oru Gramathile 1988 – En Thamizh En Makkal1990 – Pengal Veettin Kangal (dialogues only)

Television
 1997 Kaialavau Manasu 2003 Vikaramadhithan 2003 Imsai Arasigal 2008 Thangamana Purushan 2012 Amudha Oru Aacharyakuri''

List of songs

References

External links

 

1931 births
2013 deaths
Tamil male actors
Tamil film poets
Dravidian movement
Recipients of the Padma Shri in literature & education
Male actors from Tiruchirappalli
Tamil Nadu State Film Awards winners
Writers from Tiruchirappalli
Tamil-language lyricists
Tamil poets